Wingless-type MMTV integration site family, member 6, also known as WNT6, is a human gene.

The WNT gene family consists of structurally related genes that encode secreted signaling proteins. These proteins have been implicated in oncogenesis and in several developmental processes, including regulation of cell fate and patterning during embryogenesis. This gene is a member of the WNT gene family, which are involved in the Wnt signaling pathway. It is overexpressed in cervical cancer cell line and strongly coexpressed with another family member, WNT10A, in colorectal cancer cell line. The gene overexpression may play key roles in carcinogenesis. This gene and the WNT10A gene are clustered in the chromosome 2q35 region. The protein encoded by this gene is 97% identical to the mouse Wnt6 protein at the amino acid level.

Role in Development

Wnt6 plays a role in the formation and maturation of different embryonic structures, namely the fetal heart, ventral body wall, and somite derived structures. Wnt6, through the canonical Wnt signaling pathway, inhibits the induction of cardiogenic mesoderm. For this reason, Wnt6 inhibitors like Cerberus must be present to allow the cells to be induced. Knockout models show that without Wnt6 the fetus develops an enlarged heart, while upregulating Wnt6 results in the heart being underdeveloped. Several Wnts, including Wnt6, have shown to be involved in the formation of the ventral body wall and when inhibited result in birth defects such as failure of the wall to close, hypoplasia of the musculature, and other defects.  Following the formation of the somites from the Paraxial Mesoderm, the outermost cells of the somites undergo a mesenchymal to epithelial transition. Wnt6 is expressed by the overlying ectoderm and promotes the production of Paraxis, which facilitates the transition. While many structures will still form if Wnt6 is knocked out, the structures (ribs, vertebra, and muscles) are fused and not organized properly. On the other hand, if Wnt6 is upregulated, muscle in the limbs and surrounding areas are decreased as the mesenchymal progenitor cells that migrate and become the muscle are locked in the somite as epithelial cells.

References